Larisa Savchenko-Neiland (née Savchenko; also Larisa Neiland; born 21 July 1966) is a retired tennis player who represented the Soviet Union, Ukraine and Latvia. A former world number-one-ranked doubles player, Neiland won two Grand Slam women's doubles and four mixed doubles titles. She also won two singles titles and 63 doubles titles on the WTA Tour. She is listed in fourth place for the most doubles match wins (766) in WTA history, after Lisa Raymond, Rennae Stubbs and Liezel Huber.

Career
Savchenko turned professional in 1983 as No. 10 on the ITF Junior rankings in that year. Doubles team of Savchenko and Svetlana Parkhomenko reached the Wimbledon quarterfinals in 1983 and 1984, both times as an unseeded pair; beat No. 2 seeds Fairbank/Reynolds in 1983 and No. 3 seeds Horvath/Ruzici in 1984. In 1984, Savchenko reached the third round of the French Open as a qualifier, which was her best singles result at the French Open. She won her first singles title in Chicago in January 1984, where she only lost one set.

Having 1986 wins over Wendy Turnbull (twice), Ann Henricksson, and Annabel Croft, Savchenko was ranked No. 1 in USSR for 1986. She qualified for the Virginia Slims Championships in March and November 1986 with partner Svetlana Parkhomenko. She defeated Kathy Rinaldi, Peanut Louie Harper, and Nathalie Tauziat to reach the quarterfinals of Eastbourne in 1986.

Savchenko jumped from No. 53 to No. 28 (June 1983) on the Hewlett-Packard/WITA Computer rankings after performances at Birmingham and Eastbourne. She also had wins over Robin White, Ann Henricksson, Candy Reynolds, and Melissa Gurney.

In 1988, Savchenko reached her first Grand Slam doubles final with Natasha Zvereva. They lost 10–12 in the final set to Gabriela Sabatini and Steffi Graf, who in that same year won all four Grand Slam singles titles and an Olympic gold medal. In 1989, again with Zvereva, Savchenko won her first doubles Grand Slam final, over Graf and Sabatini in straight sets.

In December 1989, Larisa married Aleksandr Neiland and took his last name, she continued to compete as Larisa Savchenko-Neiland.

In 1991, she captured the Wimbledon title with Zvereva. In 1992, she lost in the US Open final to Jana Novotná and Helena Suková. She won her first mixed doubles title at Wimbledon, as well, when she and Cyril Suk teamed and won over Dutch duo Jacco Eltingh and Miriam Oremans. That year, she reached the No. 1 doubles ranking. Neiland then reached her next five doubles runners-up with Novotná. Each and every final played with Novotná was lost, the first being the US Open in 1991 and losing to Pam Shriver and Zvereva.

Her final Grand Slam doubles final appearance came in 1996 at Wimbledon. Neiland played in 2000 but retired after losing at Wimbledon. She lost in the first round, when she and her partner Lina Krasnoroutskaya lost to Ai Sugiyama and Julie Halard, the eventual runners-up, in straight sets.

Neiland tested positive for prohibited levels of the stimulant caffeine at the 1999 Australian Open. She was subsequently stripped of the $15k she had earned for reaching the women's doubles quarterfinals with Arantxa Sanchez Vicario, and issued a warning by the International Tennis Federation.

As a coach, she is best known for guiding Svetlana Kuznetsova to the 2009 French Open singles title and has been a part of the Russian Fed Cup coaching team.

Major finals

Grand Slam tournaments

Women's doubles: 12 (2 titles, 10 runner-ups)

Mixed doubles: 9 (4 titles, 5 runner-ups)

Year-end championships

Doubles: 5 (5 runner-ups)

WTA career finals

Singles: 9 (2 titles, 7 runner-ups)

Doubles: 65 titles

1990: Nashville (with Kathy Jordan)
1991: Aukland (with Patty Fendick)
1991: Boca Raton (with Natasha Zvereva)
1991: Hamburg (with Jana Novotná)
1991: Berlin (with Natasha Zvereva)
1991: Eastbourne (with Natasha Zvereva)
1991: Wimbledon (with Natasha Zvereva)
1991: Toronto (with Natasha Zvereva)
1991: Manhattan Beach (with Natasha Zvereva)
1991: Washington, D.C. (with Jana Novotná)
1991: Philadelphia (with Jana Novotná)
1992: Brisbane (with Jana Novotná)
1992: Boca Raton (with Natasha Zvereva)
1992: Key Biscayne (with Arantxa Sánchez Vicario)
1992: Wesley Chapel (with Jana Novotná)
1992: Berlin (with Jana Novotná)
1992: Eastbourne (with Jana Novotná)
1992: San Diego (with Jana Novotná)
1992: Leipzig (with Jana Novotná)

1992: Brighton (with Jana Novotná)
1993: Brisbane (with Conchita Martínez)
1993: Osaka (with Jana Novotná)
1993: Key Biscayne (with Jana Novotná)
1993: Toronto (with Jana Novotná)
1994: Osaka (with Rennae Stubbs)
1994: Amelia Island (with Arantxa Sánchez Vicario)
1994: Barcelona (with Arantxa Sánchez Vicario)
1994: Birmingham (with Zina Garrison)
1994: Schenectady (with Meredith McGrath)
1994: Brighton (with Manon Bollegraf)
1995: Paris Open Gaz de France (with Meredith McGrath)
1995: Barcelona (with Arantxa Sánchez Vicario)
1995: Edinburgh (with Meredith McGrath)
1995: Moscow (with Meredith McGrath)
1995: Leipzig (with Meredith McGrath)
1995: Brighton (with Meredith McGrath)
1996: Essen (with Meredith McGrath)
1996: Berlin (with Meredith McGrath)
1996: Rosmalen (with Brenda Schultz-McCarthy)
1996: Montreal (with Arantxa Sánchez Vicario)
1996: Moscow (with Natalia Medvedeva)
1997: Birmingham (with Katrina Adams)
1997: Luxembourg (with Helena Suková)
1999: Gold Coast (with Corina Morariu)
1999: Hamburg (with Arantxa Sánchez Vicario)
1999: Birmingham (with Corina Morariu)
1999: Los Angeles (with Arantxa Sánchez Vicario)
1999: Leipzig (with Mary Pierce)

ITF finals

Singles (2–0)

Doubles (3–1)

Women's doubles performance timeline

Head-to-head records

 Arantxa Sánchez Vicario 0–4
 Serena Williams 0–1
 Venus Williams 0–3
 Lindsay Davenport 1–1
 Steffi Graf 0–6
 Monica Seles 0–2
 Martina Navratilova 1–9

Personal life
She married Latvian tennis coach Aleksandr Neiland on 21 December 1989, after which her surname was changed from Savchenko to Neiland (Savčenko-Neiland). The marriage later ended in divorce.

References

External links
 
 
 

1966 births
Living people
Soviet emigrants to Latvia
Sportspeople from Lviv
Wimbledon champions
Latvian female tennis players
Soviet female tennis players
Tennis players at the 1988 Summer Olympics
Tennis players at the 1992 Summer Olympics
Australian Open (tennis) champions
French Open champions
Latvian tennis coaches
Latvian people of Ukrainian descent
Grand Slam (tennis) champions in women's doubles
Grand Slam (tennis) champions in mixed doubles
Grand Slam (tennis) champions in girls' doubles
Honoured Masters of Sport of the USSR
Universiade medalists in tennis
Universiade gold medalists for the Soviet Union
Universiade silver medalists for the Soviet Union
Australian Open (tennis) junior champions
Olympic tennis players of the Soviet Union
Olympic tennis players of Latvia
Competitors at the 1986 Goodwill Games
Goodwill Games medalists in tennis
Friendship Games medalists in tennis
WTA number 1 ranked doubles tennis players